2004 Emmy Awards may refer to:

 56th Primetime Emmy Awards, the 2004 Emmy Awards ceremony honoring primetime programming June 2003 – May 2004
 31st Daytime Emmy Awards, the 2004 Emmy Awards ceremony honoring daytime programming during 2003
 32nd International Emmy Awards, honoring international programming

Emmy Award ceremonies by year